Peekskill is a city in northwestern Westchester County, New York, United States,  from New York City.  Established as a village in 1816, it was incorporated as a city in 1940.  It lies on a bay along the east side of the Hudson River, across from Jones Point in Rockland County. The population was 25,431 at the 2020 US census, an increase over 23,583 during the 2010 census. It is the third largest municipality in northern Westchester County, after the towns of Cortlandt and Yorktown.
 
The area was an early American industrial center, primarily for iron plow and stove products. The Binney & Smith Company, now named Crayola LLC and makers of Crayola products, is linked to the Peekskill Chemical Company founded by Joseph Binney at Annsville in 1864, and succeeded by a partnership by his son Edwin and nephew Harold Smith in 1885. 
 
The well-publicized Peekskill Riots of 1949 involved attacks and a lynching-in-effigy occasioned by Paul Robeson's benefit concerts for the Civil Rights Congress, although the main assault following the September concert properly took place in nearby Van Cortlandtville. Nevertheless, the city of Peekskill has since had multiple African American mayors since 1984.

History

Pre-Revolution
In September 1609, Dutch explorer Henry Hudson, captain of the Half Moon, anchored along the reach of the Hudson River at Peekskill. His first mate noted in the ship's log that it was a "very pleasant place to build a town". After the establishment of the province of New Netherland, New Amsterdam resident Jan Peeck made the first recorded contact with the Lenape people of this area, then identified as "Sachoes". The date is not certain, (possibly early 1640s), but agreements and merchant transactions took place, formalized in the Ryck's Patent Deed of 1684. The name Peekskill derives from a combination of Mr. Peeck's surname and the Dutch word for stream, kil or kill.

Fort Independence

Located on the north bank of the Annsville Creek as it empties into the Hudson, Fort Independence combined with Forts Montgomery and Clinton to defend the Hudson River Valley.  Fort Independence was built in August 1776, while Forts Montgomery and Clinton were started in June.  Fort Hill Park, the site of Camp Peekskill, contained five barracks and two redoubts.

Settlement was slow in the early 18th century. By the time of the American Revolution, the tiny community was an important manufacturing center, which made it attractive to the Continental Army, which established an outpost here in 1776.  Several creeks and streams powered mills which provided gunpowder, leather, planks, and flour. Slaughterhouses provided fresh meat, easily shipped from docks along the river.  Much was needed to support several other forts and garrisons located to support the Hudson River Chains placed between Bear Mountain Bridge and Anthony's Nose during the Revolution to prevent British naval passage upriver.

Though Peekskill's terrain and mills were beneficial to the Patriot cause, they also made tempting targets for British raids. The most damaging attack took place in early spring of 1777, when an invasion force of a dozen vessels led by a warship and supported by infantry overwhelmed the American defenders. On leaving New Windsor in June, 1781, Washington established his quarters, for a short time, at Peekskill.

Post-Revolution

Peekskill's first legal incorporation of 1816 was reactivated in 1826 when Village elections took place. The Village was further incorporated within the Town of Cortlandt in 1849 and remained so until separating as a city in 1940.

In 1859 Rev. Henry Ward Beecher bought a thirty-six acre farm at Peekskill. Beecher made many improvements and established a summer home for his family. In 1902 the locally prominent McFadden family bought the property. In 1987 the Beecher-McFadden Estate was added to the National Register of Historic Places.

In August 1949, following reports misquoting Paul Robeson's speech to the World Peace Conference in Paris as stating that African Americans would not fight for the United States in any prospective war against the Soviet Union, a planned benefit concert for the Civil Rights Congress in Peekskill had to be cancelled amid White Nationalist and anti-communist violence. An effigy of Robeson was lynched in the town. The artists were able to plan a second concert in nearby Van Cortlandtville on a farm owned by a Holocaust survivor. (His house was subsequently shot into and brickbats thrown through his windows.) The publicity drew a crowd of around 20,000, and two men with rifles were discovered and removed prior to any violence during the concert itself. It was one of the earliest performances of Pete Seeger's "If I Had a Hammer"; Robeson sang surrounded by union guards and volunteers from the audience as protection against other snipers. Following the event, area police and state troopers directed exiting traffic down a single road into an ambush where rocks were thrown through car windows (even at cars with small children). Some were overturned and their occupants beaten without police intervention. These Peekskill Riots were subsequently well-publicized in news report and folk songs and formed a major event in E.L. Doctorow's historical fiction novel The Book of Daniel.

Peekskill was the landing point of a fragment of the Peekskill Meteorite, just before midnight on October 9, 1992. The meteoric trail was recorded on film by at least sixteen individuals. This was only the fourth meteorite in history for which an exact orbit is known.

The Peekskill Evening Star and the Peekskill Highland Democrat were two of the city's daily newspapers through much of the city's history. The Evening Star published under various mastheads from the 19th century on, and as the Evening Star from 1939 until 1985 when the paper folded into what would become the nexus of the Journal News, a conglomeration of local papers from throughout Westchester County. The Journal News focused more on statewide and New York City issues, however, which led to the founding of the Peekskill Herald in 1986. Although numerous prominent citizens came together to try to keep the paper afloat after a series of New York Times articles about the paper's foundering fiscal situation, it folded in 2005, being replaced by the Peekskill Daily in 2009.

The Centennial Firehouse, built in 1890, was located under a U.S. Route 9 bridge. During the original construction of the bridge in 1932 part of the roof of the firehouse was removed. As part of a 2008 highway reconstruction project it was to be relocated to a new historic district. The city spent $150,000 in grant money in preparing the building. Unfortunately a mechanical failure during a turn caused the building to collapse.

In 1984, Richard E. Jackson would become Peekskill's first African American mayor.

Geography
Peekskill is located at  (41.2889, −73.9200) in northwestern Westchester County.

The city's eastern border is the Town of Cortlandt and its western border is the Hudson River.

Demographics

As of the 2010 United States Census, there were 23,583 people living in the city. The racial makeup of the city was 35.8% White, 21.4% Black, 0.2% Native American, 2.9% Asian, <0.1% Pacific Islander, 0.3% from some other race and 2.5% from two or more races. 36.9% were Hispanic or Latino of any race. The American Community Survey in 2020, the city was 13.8% Ecuadorian, 10.4% was Puerto Rican, 4.9% Guatemalan.

As of the census of 2000, there were 22,441 people, 8,696 households, and 5,348 families living in the city. The population density was 5,189.7 people per square mile (2,005.7/km2). There were 9,053 housing units at an average density of 2,093.6 per square mile (809.1/km2). The racial makeup of the city was 57.12% White, 25.54% African American, 0.42% Native American, 2.38% Asian, 0.06% Pacific Islander, 9.83% from other races, and 4.64% from two or more races. Hispanic or Latino of any race were 21.92% of the population.

There were 8,696 households, out of which 30.5% had children under the age of 18 living with them, 39.7% were married couples living together, 16.3% had a female householder with no husband present, and 38.5% were non-families. 31.3% of all households were made up of individuals, and 10.8% had someone living alone who was 65 years of age or older. The average household size was 2.55 and the average family size was 3.18.

In the city, the population was spread out, with 24.4% under the age of 18, 8.3% from 18 to 24, 34.9% from 25 to 44, 20.9% from 45 to 64, and 11.5% who were 65 years of age or older. The median age was 35 years. For every 100 females, there were 94.2 males. For every 100 females age 18 and over, there were 91.0 males.

The median income for a household in the city was $47,177, and the median income for a family was $52,645. Males had a median income of $38,091 versus $34,757 for females. The per capita income for the city was $22,595. About 10.3% of families and 13.7% of the population were below the poverty line.

Rehabilitation efforts

Beginning in the early 1990s, Peekskill made sustained efforts to attract artists, particularly from high-rent areas in New York City. These included economic development incentives to landlords such as tax incentives, grants, facade improvements, and loans to renovate buildings that could be used as live-work spaces by artists. In 2002 the city of Peekskill and the County of Westchester joined with a private real estate company to develop The Peekskill Art Lofts, a 28 unit limited equity income  co-op offering artists an opportunity for affordable home ownership. By one account, upwards of 50 artists in all relocated to the community.

Some local art-related highlights included Paramount Center for the Arts, a restored 1930 movie palace which served as the area's cultural hub, offering music, comedy, drama and independent films before suspending operations in 2012; the Hudson Valley Center for Contemporary Art;STUDIO No.9 Gallery and Workshops; and the Peekskill Coffee House, which showcases local acts. The Bean Runner Cafe, on South Division Street, and 12 Grapes, on North Division Street, also showcase local artists and musicians.

Media
Locally owned WLNA 1420 AM has served the community since 1948.

Parks
The town contains several parks and recreation areas, including Charles Point, with bay and river views; Depew Park, which has pools and a pond in addition to ballfields and trails and is the home of the Recreation Department headquarters; Franklin Park; Lepore Park; Fort Hill Park; Peekskill Dog Park; Peekskill Stadium; Riverfront Green Park; and Tompkins Park (home of Little League).

Education

Primary and secondary schools
The Peekskill City School District is the local school district, with Peekskill High School being the main high school.

The Roman Catholic Archdiocese of New York operates Catholic schools in Westchester County. Our Lady of the Assumption School in Peekskill closed in 2013. The closest Catholic school to Peekskill is St. Columbanus School, which is located in Cortlandt Manor.

Healthcare
Peekskill is served by the Hudson Valley Hospital Center (HVHC), founded in 1889 as Peekskill Hospital on lower South Street.  In 2014, the hospital began an affiliation with New York-Presbyterian Hospital and is now referred to as New York Presbyterian – Hudson Valley Hospital.

The hospital has 128 inpatient beds and includes a comprehensive cancer center, maternity center, neonatal intensive care unit and surgery center among several other patient care services.

The city also has an emergency medical service staffed by EMTs and paramedics from the city's fire department and volunteer ambulance corps. The fire department staffs seven EMTs and eight paramedics whereas the volunteer corps has 60 active riding members. Most patients are transported to NYP-Hudson Valley Hospital.

Transportation

The Bee-Line Bus System provides bus service to Peekskill on routes 14, 15, 16, 17, 18, and 31. The Bear Mountain Bridge, five miles (8 km) to the northwest, gives road access to Bear Mountain State Park across the Hudson River, Palisades Interstate Parkway and to the United States Military Academy at West Point via US 6 and US 202. The Croton Expressway portion of US 9 ends here. NY 9A and NY 35 also run through the city.

Notable people

 Hilton Armstrong, NBA basketball professional, is a Peekskill High School graduate.
 Reggie Austin, an actor, was born in Peekskill and is a Peekskill High School Graduate.
 Peter Bagge, a noted cartoonist, was born and brought up in Peekskill.
 Becca Balint, Congresswoman for Vermont's at-large congressional district, raised in Peekskill
 Henry Ward Beecher was an influential Civil War-era minister who built his family mansion on East Main Street in 1878.
 T. C. Boyle (born 1948), a novelist, is a former Peekskill resident.
 Elton Brand, an NBA All-Star basketball professional is a Peekskill High School graduate.
 Benjamin Civiletti, a former United States Attorney General and attorney, was born in Peekskill.
Harriet Redfield Cobb, longtime math professor at Smith College, born in Peekskill
 Chauncey Depew was chairman of the board of the New York Central Railroad and then served as a United States senator for New York.
 Abel Ferrara, an independent filmmaker, was born in the Bronx, moved to Peekskill as a child and graduated from high school there.
 Mel Gibson, actor, director, producer and screenwriter, was born in Peekskill.
 Jackie Gleason, actor and comedian, lived in Peekskill from 1959 to 1963.
 Theodore Haupt, American modernist artist, lived in Peekskill from 1941 until 1948.
 Samuel Frost Haviland, established first bank in Chile.
 James William Husted (1870-1925) was a politician elected to four succeeding terms as a U.S. Representative (1915–1923) from New York.
 Richard E. Jackson, a former Peekskill mayor (1984–1992), was the first African-American mayor in New York State.
 Tre Johnson, a former NFL lineman graduated from Peekskill High School, and had a nine-year NFL career highlighted by his selection to the 2000 Pro Bowl with the Washington Redskins.
Sean Murphy, MLB catcher for the Atlanta Braves
 George Pataki, former New York Governor (served 1995–2006) was born in Peekskill. He served as Peekskill's mayor from 1981 to 1984. 
 Cornelius A. Pugsley was a congressman and preservationist whose name is still attached to a national preservation award for public parks.
 Paul Reubens, an entertainer (aka Pee-wee Herman; born 1952)
 Kirtanananda Swami Bhaktipada (born Keith Gordon Ham), Hare Krishna guru
 Herb Trimpe, a longtime Marvel Comics artist (The Incredible Hulk) was raised in Peekskill.
 Stanley Tucci, an actor (born 1960) was born in Peekskill.

Popular culture
The 1980s American sitcom The Facts of Life was about teenagers and young women who attend a fictional all-girls' boarding school in Peekskill, named Eastland School for Girls (inspired by a now-defunct all-girls school that still overlooks the city) and similarly fictional Langley College.

See also
 Depew Park
 Lincoln Depot Museum
 National Register of Historic Places listings in Peekskill, New York
 Peekskill Freight Depot
 Standard House
 The Waterfront

References

External links

 
 Article about Peekskill which includes St. Mary's as being influential to The Facts of Life 
Tocqueville in Peekskill – Segment from C-SPAN's Alexis de Tocqueville Tour

 
Cities in New York (state)
New York (state) populated places on the Hudson River
Populated places established in 1684
Cities in Westchester County, New York
Cities in the New York metropolitan area
1684 establishments in the Province of New York